Alveley is a civil parish in Shropshire, England.  It contains 32 listed buildings that are recorded in the National Heritage List for England.  Of these, three are listed at Grade II*, the middle grade of the three grades, and the others are at Grade II, the lowest grade.  The parish contains the village of Alvley and the settlements of Coton, Kingsnordley, and Tuck Hill, and is otherwise rural.  Many of the listed buildings are in the village, clustered around the church, and others are scattered through the countryside.  Most of the listed buildings are country houses, smaller houses and cottages, farmhouses and farm buildings, and associated structures.  The other listed buildings include churches and items in and around churchyards, public houses, crosses, and a disused chapel. 


Key

Buildings

References

Citations

Sources

Lists of buildings and structures in Shropshire